Napoli Centrale (Naples Central Station)  is the main railway station in the city of Naples and in southern Italy and the sixth largest station in Italy in terms of passenger flow with an annual ridership of 50 million. It is located next to Piazza Garibaldi to the east of the old city. It is the primary rail terminus and station for Naples, and serves Trenitalia national railways and EAV. This one has an underground section known as Stazione di Napoli Piazza Garibaldi (Naples Garibaldi Piazza station), which is served by the metropolitan trains of the line 2, line 1 (Garibaldi), and 3, 12, 14, and 15 EAV Circumvesuviana lines which is accessible from 2 entrances inside the Centrale station, 1 outside in glass, and from the new Garibaldi Square.

History
The first station on the site was built in 1866 on a design by the architect Enrico Alvino and it was opened on 7 May of the following year. The current station was designed in 1954 by Pier Luigi Nervi, Carlo Cocchia, Massimo Battaglini, Bruno Zevi, Giulio De Luca, Luigi Piccinato and Giuseppe Vaccaro on the site of the old railway station and overlooks the square dedicated to Giuseppe Garibaldi. The project was completed in 1960. The station has undergone a deep restyling lasting five years and finished in August 2010, which concerned both the platform and the underground floor, with the installation of new escalators, elevators, lights, benches, shops and the replacement of the original floors made in black linoleum with a more modern white tile covering.

Transport
The station has 25 tracks. It is connected to Rome by high-speed trains on the Rome–Naples high-speed railway line as well as slower trains on the original Rome–Cassino–Naples line and the Rome–Formia–Naples Direttissima opened in 1927. It is connected to Salerno and southern Italy by the traditional Naples–Salerno line and the recently opened Naples–Salerno high-speed line used by long-distance trains.

Train services
The station is served by the following services (incomplete):

High speed services (Frecciarossa) Turin - Milan - Reggio Emilia - Bologna - Florence - Rome - Naples - Salerno
2 trains a day extend north to Brescia and 2 trains extend south to Taranto
High speed services (Frecciarossa) Venice - Padua - Bologna - Florence - Rome - Naples - Salerno
High speed services (Frecciargento) Rome - Naples - Salerno - Paola -  Lamezia Terme - Rosarno - Reggio di Calabria
High speed services (Frecciargento) Bolzano - Trento - Rovereto - Verona - Bologna - Florence - Rome - Naples
High speed services (Frecciabianca) Rome - Naples - Salerno - Sapri - Lamezia - Vibo Valentia - Reggio Calabria
High speed services (Italo) Turin - Milan - Reggio Emilia - Bologna - Florence - Rome - Naples - Salerno
High speed services (Italo) Brescia - Desenzano - Peschiera del Garda - Verona - Bologna - Florence - Rome - Naples
Intercity services Rome - Naples - Salerno - Lamezia Terme - Messina - Palermo
Intercity services Rome - Naples - Salerno - Lamezia Terme - Messina - Siracusa
Intercity services Rome - Naples - Salerno - Lamezia Terme - Reggio di Calabria
Intercity services Rome - Naples - Salerno - Taranto
Intercity services Turin - Genoa - La Spezia - Pisa - Livorno - Rome - Naples - Salerno
Intercity services Livorno - Civitavecchia - Rome - Naples
Night train (Intercity Notte) Rome - Naples - Messina - Siracusa
Night train (Intercity Notte) Turin - Genoa - La Spezia - Pisa - Livorno - Rome - Naples - Salerno
Regional services (Treno Regionale) Rome - Pomezia - Latina - Formia - Minturno - Naples

Napoli Piazza Garibaldi railway station
Below the mainline station is an underground station named Napoli Piazza Garibaldi railway station, for the Villa Literno–Napoli Gianturco railway, used by the metropolitan train of the line 2.  There is also a connection to the nearby Circumvesuviana Napoli Piazza Garibaldi.

See also

History of rail transport in Italy
List of railway stations in Campania
Railway stations in Italy

References

External links

 official page at Grandistazioni website

Centrale
Railway stations opened in 1866
Buildings and structures in Naples
Railway stations opened in 1960
1866 establishments in Italy
Railway stations in Italy opened in the 19th century
Railway stations in Italy opened in the 21st century